Piandimeleto is a comune (municipality) in the Province of Pesaro e Urbino in the Italian region Marche, located about  west of Ancona and about  southwest of Pesaro.

Piandimeleto borders the following municipalities: Belforte all'Isauro, Carpegna, Frontino, Lunano, Macerata Feltria, Pietrarubbia, Sant'Angelo in Vado, Sassocorvaro Auditore, Sestino, Urbino. Its territory is included in the Sasso Simone and Simoncello Regional Park. The Foglia river flows near the town.

References

External links 
 

Cities and towns in the Marche